Pollard Branch (also called Pollards Branch) is a stream in Shelby County in the U.S. state of Missouri.

Pollard Branch has the name of Elijah Pollard, a pioneer settler.

See also
List of rivers of Missouri

References

Rivers of Shelby County, Missouri
Rivers of Missouri